Aprepodoxa is a genus of moths belonging to the family Tortricidae.

Species
Aprepodoxa glycitis (Meyrick, 1928)
Aprepodoxa mimocharis Meyrick in Caradja & Meyrick, 1937

See also
List of Tortricidae genera

References

 , 2005: World Catalogue of Insects volume 5 Tortricidae.
 , 1937, Dt. ent. Z. Iris 51: 171

External links
Tortricid.net

Cochylini
Tortricidae genera